Norema AS is a Norwegian kitchen manufacturer. Its main office is in Bergermoen near Jevnaker, Oppland.

It was bought by the Swedish corporation Nobia in 2000. As of 10 January 2008 Norema and Sigdal, also owned by Swedish Nobia, were without CEOs. Both companies were under the supervision of Nobia Norway.

References

Manufacturing companies of Norway
Norwegian brands